Marcela Bednar is a West German-German sprint canoer who competed in the 1990s. She won three medals at the ICF Canoe Sprint World Championships with two golds (K-4 500 m: 1997, K-4 500 m: 1998, both for Germany) and a bronze (K-4 500 m: 1990 for West Germany).

References

West German female canoeists
Living people
Year of birth missing (living people)
ICF Canoe Sprint World Championships medalists in kayak